The 45th World Cup season began on 23 October 2010, in Sölden, Austria, and concluded on 20 March 2011, at the World Cup finals in Lenzerheide, Switzerland.

Being an odd-numbered year, the biennial World Championships took place in February. The 2011 World Championships were held between 8–20 February at Garmisch Classic in Garmisch-Partenkirchen, Bavaria, Germany.

The season saw the introduction of a new event to the World Cup, the city event. The race in parallel giant slalom took place in Munich, Germany.

The overall titles were won by Maria Riesch of Germany and Ivica Kostelić of Croatia; both skiers winning their first overall crowns. Kostelić secured his overall victory several races before the end of the season while Riesch and Lindsey Vonn of the United States were close together before the finals at Lenzerheide, Switzerland. Riesch had a significant lead after the World Championship but Vonn caught up and took the lead before the last slalom race. Slovenia's Tina Maze won her first slalom in that race, Riesch's fourth place compared to Vonn's thirteenth gave her a three-point advantage. The cancellation of the last race – one of four to be cancelled at Lenzerheide – meant that Riesch won the title.

Calendar

Men

Ladies

Nation team event

Men's standings

Overall

Downhill

Super-G

Giant slalom

Slalom

Super combined

Ladies' standings

Overall

Downhill

Super-G

Giant slalom

Slalom

Super combined

Nations Cup

Overall

Men

Ladies

Footnotes

References

External links

2010-11
World Cup
World Cup